Sergey Kolunov (born 22 March 1973, Kazan, Tatar Autonomous Soviet Socialist Republic) is a Russian political figure and deputy of the 8th State Duma.

After graduating from the State University of Management in 1995, Kolunov had an internship at the University of Wolverhampton (Great Britain). In 1995–2003, he worked as a representative of the Italian Furniture Company. In 2003, he founded his own investment and development company "Sodovoe Koltso". Since September 2021, he has served as deputy of the 8th State Duma.

References

1973 births
Living people
United Russia politicians
21st-century Russian politicians
Eighth convocation members of the State Duma (Russian Federation)